Robbie Williams: Live at the O2 is a live album released by British singer-songwriter Robbie Williams on 24 November 2012, as a commemoration of his live performances at The O2 Arena, London on 22, 23 and 24 November 2012. The album was available to attendants of the concerts straight after the performances, and later via Williams' official website. The album features guest appearances from Gary Barlow and Guy Chambers. The album contains three discs, each of which contains part of the specific concert in question.

Track listing

Release history

References

2012 live albums
Robbie Williams albums